LECO Corporation, founded in 1936 by Carl Schultz and George Krasl, operates its analytical instrumentation research and development, and manufacturing from its headquarters located in St. Joseph, Michigan. LECO develops and manufactures elemental measurement and molecular Time-of-flight mass spectrometry instrumentation, following ISO 9000 standards. The LECO trademark is an acronym of the original name, Laboratory Equipment Corporation.  One of LECO's early products was a combustion analyzer invented by Krasl in 1957 that used crucibles invented by his employee Eugene Bennet., 

LECO carries out research in many fields of analytical chemistry including protein measurement in foods, sulfur in coal emissions, glow discharge emission in metals, multi-dimensional gas chromatograph mass spectrometry, environmental monitoring, air quality, Metabolomics, and diverse medical and pharmaceutical applications.  LECO has been a manufacturer and distributor of metallographic equipment since the 1970s, and makes ceramic products for the foundry industry.  LECO Corporation has sales subsidiaries worldwide.

As of June 8, 1977, Robert J. Warren (1933-2022), husband of Elizabeth D. Schultz and son-in-law of Carl Schultz, and family have become the sole owners of the company, acquiring outstanding stocks which had become the property of the George J. Krasl Trust following George Krasl's death on August 5, 1976.  Bob Warren was hired by LECO in 1968 and became its president in 1975.  LECO became a worldwide supplier of instruments and metallographic equipment under Warren's management, and one of southwestern Michigan's larger employers.  He was succeeded as CEO by his sons upon his retirement in 2016.

See also 
 Scientific instruments

References

Technology companies of the United States
Companies based in Michigan